Arthur Frederick "Peggy" Bettinson (10 March 1862 – 4 December 1926) was a skilled pugilist, becoming English Amateur Boxing Association Lightweight Champion in 1882. In 1891 Bettinson co-founded the National Sporting Club (NSC). As its manager, he implemented a strict code of conduct, rules and etiquette that was adhered to by both boxers and spectators, ushering in a culture change that brought respect and legitimacy to what had been a barely regulated, lawless and chaotic sport. He was one of boxing's most prominent and powerful advocates in England's courtrooms in an era when boxing's legal status was uncertain.

Utilising his extensive knowledge of the sport and his no-nonsense reputation, Bettinson promoted many fighters, events and tournaments in boxing and wrestling. His crusade for firm rules and fair play encouraged a growing number of wealthy backers to pour their influence and money into these sports.

Bettinson refereed bouts in London and Wales, controversially disqualifying Jim Driscoll in 1910. The NSC enhanced the reputation and reach of boxing during World War I, working with various regiments to lay on training and tournaments for the British and French armed forces. They also raised money to supply ambulance cars to the British Red Cross and the Allies. He authored and co-authored a number of books during his life, exulting his theories on the art of boxing. Bettinson was inducted into the International Boxing Hall of Fame in 2011.

Early life

Nickname 
Bettinson was once asked how he gained the nickname "Peggy":

Work and sport 
Bettinson was born 10 March 1862 into a working-class family. His father, John George Bettinson, was a general labourer, builder and joiner. Bettinson spent his teenage years completing an apprenticeship in upholstery. As a young man Bettinson excelled in a variety of sports; he was an accomplished rugby player and cricketer. He swam at the Annual 100-yard Amateur Championships held at the Lambeth Baths, finishing 2nd in 1883.

Boxing was Bettinson's chief passion. At the age of 19 he reached the semi-finals of the inaugural Amateur Boxing Association (ABA) finals that took place in London in 1881, as a middleweight representing the German Gymnastic Society. He lost to the eventual winner William Brown (Birmingham ABC). The following year he entered the competition as a lightweight. Aged 20, he succeeded in his aim of winning the title, defeating W. Shillcock (Birmingham ABC) in the final. Bettinson continued to fight in amateur exhibition bouts until the age of 29.

Origins of the National Sporting Club

Forerunner 
The Pelican Club was opened in Gerrard Street, London in 1887 by Earnest Wells. John Fleming was the manager. Among its numerous upper-class patrons was John Douglas, 9th Marquess of Queensberry, who put his name to a set of boxing rules which became the basic framework of the modern sport: the Queensberry rules. Despite its aristocratic clientele, the Pelican gained an infamous reputation as a gambling establishment for Prize-fighting, which was illegal in England. Its neighbours filed an injunction at the High Court against the club, due to the loutish behaviour and noise emanating from the Pelican in the early hours. By the start of January 1892, the Pelican had closed. The Bridport News reported that many of its leading members had already deserted the club and some had gone on to create new clubs, where from "...its ashes, the mistakes of the old club have been avoided, and an objectionable element in its membership has been rigidly excluded."

Founding 

In search of a new premises, Bettinson and Fleming found and purchased a once-popular evening restaurant and concert room, the Old Falstaff Club, which had gone into liquidation. Bettinson recruited all the founding members, including most of the prominent bookmakers in London. Hugh Lowther, 5th Earl of Lonsdale was to be the face of the club as its president. The National Sporting Club (NSC) opened 5 March 1891 at 43 King Street, Covent Garden, London. The opening night was a major success according to newspapers of the time. Bettinson provided most of the capital that had underwritten the new venture, and was said by several sources to have been opinionated, outspoken and autocratic and a benevolent dictator.

Primarily due to boxing's dubious legal status at that time the NSC was a private members club, an arrangement tolerated by the courts. The NSC  "was a businesslike undertaking of business men for other business men". A strict code of conduct was expected of the club's patrons, such as a formal dress charter, silence and a no-smoking policy at ring side during bouts. This culture change was rigorously enforced by Bettinson. A modified version of the Queensberry Rules, called the National Sporting Club rules, were enforced by the referees during boxing matches. This included a maximum of 20 three-minute rounds, with one minute's rest in-between;  padded gloves were worn and a rudimentary points system was introduced. The boxers would comply with the referees' decisions at all times and bow to the crowd when the bout finished.  As the NSC was one of the only sanctioned boxing venues in 1890s London, its board acted as the national supervisory agency for boxing. This helped to standardise boxing rules and practice. The NSC board was the precursor to the British Boxing Board of Control.

In November 1897 John Fleming was found dead in a toilet cubicle at the NSC. Out of respect, all business at the club was suspended until the following month. Bettinson carried on as sole manager.

Boxing on trial 
The legality of boxing was a dubious and contentious subject in this era. Prize fighting was illegal, but "scientific exhibitions of skill for points" were not. Following deaths in the ring, the Old Bailey was the venue for four legal battles from 1897 to 1901 between the state and the growing professional boxing establishment, of which Bettinson and the NSC was at the centre. Boxing was on trial in many parts of the UK .

Death of Walter Croot 
On Monday 6 December 1897, business at the NSC resumed after John Fleming's funeral. There was a bout that night between Walter Croot of Leytonstone and Jim Barry of Chicago in a lightweight contest. Croot was knocked out in the 20th round. The South Wales Daily News wrote that Croot's friends only became concerned a few hours after the fight had finished as he had not regained consciousness. Croot was pronounced dead at 0900 the morning after the fight. Jim Barry and his trainer, T Smith, were arrested at the NSC that afternoon for manslaughter. Bettinson and the referee were charged "with being concerned in causing manslaughter". All charged were remanded on bail.

The inquest was heard at St Clement Danes Hall, Strand, 13 December 1897. Mr Gill represented Bettinson and the NSC. He gave testament about the safety considerations and rules regarding boxing at the club. The inquest found that during the match the deceased fell and struck his head, and the medical testimony was to the effect that death was due to a fracture of the skull. The Coroner's jury, by a majority of twelve out of fourteen, returned a verdict of accidental death. All charges were dropped.

Death of Tom Turner 
Nathaniel Smith defeated Tom Turner by knockout in the 13th round at the NSC on 7 November 1898. Turner died three days later without regaining consciousness. Bettinson, Smith and all others directly involved with the fight were charged at Bow Street Police Court for "being concerned in the manslaughter of Tom Turner". A police officer testified that he had approached the club before the bout, saying that if there were to be a fatality, the organisers would be held responsible and would be liable to being charged. All charged were remanded for a week.

Bettinson and the others involved were sent to trial at the Old Bailey, charged with culpable manslaughter. This was despite the coroners jury ruling there was no case to answer, as the autopsy revealed that Turner had a "small heart" and the cause of death was a blood clot to the brain. Bettinson gave evidence, testifying that the normal rules and precautions were followed.  gloves were used for the bout (the maximum weight was ). The recorder, Sir Charles Hall, addressed the grand jury, saying it was peculiar that this case was brought to trial due to no evidence of wrongdoing being present. Lloyd's Weekly Newspaper reported Hall's words: "boxing was a perfectly legitimate thing. It was a manly thing and he hoped the day would be long distant when boxing would cease to be a natural kind of sport and recreation". The jury threw out the bill. After this trial, the NSC made it a requirement that boxers were examined by a physician on the day of the bout.

Death of Mike Riley 
In January 1900 Mike Riley of Glasgow was unable to leave his corner when time was called for the 10th round and took a knee, so the referee ended the fight and Mathew Precious of Birmingham was declared winner. Riley's condition deteriorated and he was rushed to Charing Cross Hospital, where he died soon after. As before, Bettinson and all involved in the bout were arrested and charged at Bow Street Police Court with culpable manslaughter of the deceased. All defendants paid  for bail pending trial.

The coroner's report found that Riley suffered a brain haemorrhage. The coroner's jury heard evidence from Bettinson, including the fact that both boxers were examined by an NSC physician on the day of the bout, and passed a verdict of accidental death. The rider of this verdict added that the jury believed Bettinson's NSC took every reasonable precaution. This case proved to be a more-protracted affair at the Bow Street Police Court, with six days of technical legal arguments ensuing between the defence and prosecution on whether this was "sparring" (the term for a "gloved fight" at the time) where an accidental death would be legal, or a prize fight, which would be illegal on both counts. The magistrate deferred the case to trial. The recorder of the Old Bailey put the case to the grand jury, arguing that again there was no case to answer, and the case was thrown out.

Death of Billy Smith 
On 22 April 1901 Jack Roberts of London defeated Billy Smith (real name Murray Livingstone) of the US after Livingstone went down and couldn't continue in the 8th round. Livingstone was taken to Charing Cross Hospital and died soon after. As per the usual procedure, Bettinson, Roberts and all overs involved in the bout were arrested and charged with culpable manslaughter. The ensuing coroner's hearing came back with the verdict of accidental death.

During the trial at the Old Bailey in May, the prosecution changed tactics from the previous court cases by laying blame of the death on the sport of boxing rather than the actions of the individuals. Bettinson faced tough questions from the prosecution who were aiming to discredit the rules by which bouts were fought at the NSC. The jurors could not agree a verdict, so a new trial was scheduled for June 1901.

The retrial concluded 28 June 1901. The defendants were acquitted of all charges, with the judge suggesting the fatal damage was caused by Livingstone falling on the ropes and not from a blow.

This case is significant in the sport's history. It was the last time the UK State attempted to outlaw the sport due to a fatality. Boxing was effectively legalised, though this wasn't the last legal challenge.

Driscoll v Moran 

Famous boxers Jim Driscoll and Owen Moran were to fight for the World Featherweight title in Birmingham on 16 December 1911. Before the bout took place, both boxers and the promoter of the event, Gerald Austin, were summoned to the Birmingham Court, accused of arranging and attempting to participate in a prize fight.

The prosecution's argument was that as the boxers were fighting for a very large purse, the motivation was to win the match by any means, not to scientifically spar for points. The prosecution also cited the wording of the contract, which stated that the bout was to be fought under "straight Queensberry Rules" which had the word "battle" indicating that the opponents would use anger and brute force, not skill.

NSC committee members traveled to Birmingham to give testaments in defence of boxing. Lord Lonsdale stated that the bout would be fought under National Sporting Club rules, which had greatly expanded and enhanced protections of the original Queensbury rules.

Bettinson testified that if a man leading on points was knocked out, he may still win. On this occasion, the bout was outlawed and labelled a prize fight by the judge.

The Crown overturned the decision on appeal two years later, and the pair had their bout, at the NSC, ending in a draw.

This was not the last time Bettinson had to appear in court to represent the NSC and the sport of boxing.

New classes and belts

Conception 
In 1909 Bettinson and his NSC committee were discussing the introduction of additional weight classes and championship belts to NSC sanctioned bouts, and by extension, British boxing. In an interview with Sporting Life, 22 January 1909, Bettinson is quoted as saying "The question of uniformity of weight is most desirable" and that "I agree that the vast number of boxers makes it necessary that a couple of extra classes are added to the present six". He also went on to stress that boxers should be able to challenge at different weights if they had proven themselves.

On the championship belts, Bettinson said that it would be good for the sport if championship belts were made for each class, adding that there should be a time limit of around 3–6 months on how long a champion could hold the belt before accepting a legitimate challenge, and if the champion made a certain number of defences or held the belt for a certain number of years, he should be able to keep that belt, with the successor getting a newly made one. "[It] would [be a] good idea to launch these belts into the sport by way a tournament..." Bettinson pitched, "I should like to see it".

NSC weight classes 
On 11 February 1909 the NSC Committee, headed by Bettinson, voted to adopt eight classes with standardised weights for British boxing championships and thereafter began to reach agreement with other international bodies.

The Lonsdale Belt 

The Challenge Belt was the name given to the NSC championship belts for each weight class. They were made by London jewellers Mappin and Web at their Birmingham workshop, and were sponsored by the Earl of Lonsdale.

Bettinson published details about the terms and conditions agreed by the NSC of holding the belt in Sporting Life on 22 December 1909. The main rules were:
 The holder must defend his title within 6 months of a challenge.
 The belt becomes the holder's absolute property after 3 successful defences or after being held for 3 consecutive years. Outright winners will also receive an NSC pension of  a year from the age of 50.
 The holder must pay a deposit and insurance for the belt.
The first recipient of this belt was Freddie Welsh, who defeated Johnny Summers for the NSC British Lightweight title on 8 November 1909.

Even though the NSC was still a private gentleman's club, Bettinson's committee now had the exclusive rights to sanction British title fights.

Record as referee 
Bettinson occasionally refereed boxing matches, his first recorded bout as referee was at the age of 28 at the Pelican Club, his last was aged 61 at the NSC.

Promoter

Boxing 
Bettinson promoted and managed a number of boxers. The sport grew on interest from wealthy backers wagering on their favoured boxers. Bettinson would furnish the backers with professional advice as to the boxers' character and capabilities. Arrangements would be made by Bettinson and his club for training space, ensuring that the boxer was in prime condition for his fight against a suitably matched opponent. As the reputation of the NSC grew, so did the confidence of the backers and the size of the wagers.

One of Bettinson's notable charges was World Bantamweight Champion Tom "Pedlar" Palmer. In 1899 Bettinson took Palmer to New York to fight "Terrible" Terry McGovern. Bettinson was dismissive of McGovern before the fight, responding to the press: "With all due respect, McGovern is just a slugger...Palmer will hold on to his title for a fifth time and you can bank on it". Palmer lost his title by knockout to McGovern two minutes and thirty-two seconds into the bout.

Wrestling 
Under the authority of the NSC committee, Bettinson attempted to re-invigorate the sport of wrestling in England by setting up, directing, and promoting Catch As Catch Can Wrestling tournaments. The first tourney was held at the Alhambra Hall in 1908, as the NSC was not large enough to hold the spectacle, which was billed as "The World's Catch Can Championships" by Sporting Life. Lord Lonsdale supplied championship cups for the winners at each weight, worth  each. These tournaments lasted until 1910.

The Great War 

Bettinson's NSC Committee actively encouraged the British Armed Forces to participate in the sport of boxing, especially during World War I. The sport was seen as an excellent way of instilling discipline, aiding fitness levels and testing a man's mettle for war. It was also seen by the NSC as a further way to raise the profile and respectability of boxing.

Bettinson regularly hosted and promoted boxing tournaments between the different regiments of the British Army and against the  Royal Navy. Inter-service boxing tournaments continue to this day.

Many of the era's top British boxers, most of whom were nurtured by Bettinson's NSC, enlisted either for active service or to act as physical training instructors for their adopted regiments. These boxers helped to raise morale and put on boxing exhibitions.

In 1916 the NSC Committee started to fund and donate ambulance cars to the British Red Cross and the Allies in order to aid the war effort.

Post war 
In June 1918 the creation of the British Boxing Board of Control was announced from the premises of the NSC. Its official aim was to encourage boxing in general, raise the standard of professional boxing and to act as a central board. The board was filled with 10 members of the NSC committee. Lionel Bettinson took Arthur Bettinson's place as manager of the NSC is 1925.

Personal life and death 

Bettinson married Florence Olivia Cecilia Mallet in 1890; they had two sons, Lionel (1893–1977) and Ralph Bettinson (1908–1974). Olivia died in 1919. Bettinson married Harriett Flint two months later.

Bettinson died at his home in Hampstead, 24 December 1926, from heart failure following pneumonia.

Legacy 
Bettinson's funeral was held at Highgate Cemetery on 29 December 1926. Among the attendees were Pedlar Palmer, Jimmy Wilde, Joe Beckett and Joe Bowker. Many wreaths were sent, one from Mr Val Baker, President of the Amateur Boxing Association, which read: "From an old admirer and disciple of the old champion".

Bettinson was inducted into the 'Pioneer' category of the International Boxing Hall of Fame in 2011.

Publications

See also 
 Catch as can Wrestling
 English boxing
 Hugh Lowther, 5th Earl of Lonsdale
 International Boxing Hall of Fame
 John Douglas, 9th Marquess of Queensberry
 Lonsdale Belt
 National Sporting Club
 Prize fighting

References

Sources

External links 
 Green Plaque unveiled at 43 King Street in Covent Garden by City of Westminster Council
 International Boxing Hall Of Fame webpage for Bettinson

1862 births
1926 deaths
Burials at Highgate Cemetery
English male boxers
Boxers from Greater London
Lightweight boxers
International Boxing Hall of Fame inductees
British boxing promoters
Founders of charities
British boxing referees
England Boxing champions
Boxing people
Boxing clubs in the United Kingdom